Watch It, Sucker! is the second and most acclaimed album released by American comic and actress LaWanda Page, who released the album in 1977 under the name LaWanda.

This was the first album where a group of musicians accompanied her creating more of the "party album" atmosphere of albums by her contemporaries, including best friends Redd Foxx and Rudy Ray Moore. As she was announced in her first live album, LaWanda was introduced by the emcee as "The Queen of Comedy".

This album went gold on the strength of the comic's success as Aunt Esther on the hit show, Sanford and Son, and was often sampled in hip-hop recordings. The album includes one of her most raunchy bits, "The Crazy House", in which she talks about a mentally disturbed woman "climbing the walls" screaming for a "long black dick", ending with her quoting a nurse, "you was crazy as hell when they brought you here, but you're in your right damn mind now."

The album also includes the raunchy preacher skits that she later revised for her third solo album, Preach On Sister, Preach On!. LaWanda parodies The Isley Brothers' "It's Your Thing" after praising men for "jerking off" during one preacher skit called "It's Your Thing".

Track listing
 "Hoe House Blues"
 "The Whores in Church"
 "Crazy House"
 "Bus Driver"
 "Thermometer"
 "Bye Bye Black Bird"
 "Ring Dang Do"
 "Star In The East" 
 "Darkie"
 "The Buggy Ride"
 "Welcome"
 "Open Drawer Whores"
 "Suck It Dry" 
 "Karate Monkey" 
 "The Hoe'in Game"
 "It's Your Thing"

External links
 Watch It, Sucker! at CD Universe.com

LaWanda Page albums
1972 albums
Laff Records albums